Aechmea nudicaulis is a bromeliad species in the genus Aechmea, which is  often used as an ornamental plant. This species is native to Central America, the West Indies, central and southern Mexico, and northern and central South America.

The following varieties are recognized :

 Aechmea nudicaulis var. aequalis  L.B.Sm. & Reitz, 1963  - Espírito Santo
 Aechmea nudicaulis var. cuspidata  Baker, 1879  - Brazil, Guyana, Venezuela, Ecuador
 Aechmea nudicaulis var. nordestina  J.A. Siqueira & Leme, 2006 - northeastern Brazil
 Aechmea nudicaulis var. nudicaulis - most of species range

A number of cultivars derived from this species are commercially available. These are either selected forms, or hybrids arising from crosses with other species, including:
Aechmea 'Parati'
Aechmea 'Rakete'

References

nudicaulis
Flora of South America
Flora of Central America
Flora of the Caribbean
Flora of Mexico
Plants described in 1753
Taxa named by Carl Linnaeus
Flora without expected TNC conservation status